An aircraft catapult is a device used to allow aircraft to take off from a very limited amount of space, such as the deck of a vessel, but can also be installed on land-based runways in rare cases. It is now most commonly used on aircraft carriers, as a form of assisted take off.

In the form used on aircraft carriers the catapult consists of a track, or slot, built into the flight deck, below which is a large piston or shuttle that is attached through the track to the nose gear of the aircraft, or in some cases a wire rope, called a catapult bridle, is attached to the aircraft and the catapult shuttle. Other forms have been used historically, such as mounting a launching cart holding a seaplane on a long girder-built structure mounted on the deck of a warship or merchant vessel, but most catapults share a similar sliding track concept.

Different means have been used to propel the catapult, such as weight and derrick, gunpowder, flywheel, air pressure, hydraulic, and steam power, and solid fuel rocket boosters. The U.S. Navy is developing the use of Electromagnetic Aircraft Launch Systems with the construction of the s.

Historically it was most common for seaplanes to be catapulted, allowing them to land on the water near the vessel and be hoisted on board, although in WWII (before the advent of the escort carrier) conventional fighter planes (notably the Hawker Hurricane) would sometimes be catapulted from "catapult-equipped merchant" (CAM) vessels to drive off enemy aircraft, forcing the pilot to either divert to a land based airstrip, or to jump out by parachute or ditch in the water near the convoy and wait for rescue.

History

First recorded flight using a catapult

Aviation pioneer and Smithsonian Secretary Samuel Langley used a spring-operated catapult to launch his successful flying models and his failed Aerodrome of 1903. Likewise the Wright Brothers beginning in 1904 used a weight and derrick styled catapult to assist their early aircraft with a takeoff in a limited distance.

On 31 July 1912, Theodore Gordon Ellyson became the first person to be launched from a U.S. Navy catapult system. The Navy had been perfecting a compressed-air catapult system and mounted it on the Santee Dock in Annapolis, Maryland. The first attempt nearly killed Lieutenant Ellyson when the plane left the ramp with its nose pointing upward and it caught a crosswind, pushing the plane into the water. Ellyson was able to escape from the wreckage unhurt. On 12 November 1912, Lt. Ellyson made history as the Navy's first successful catapult launch, from a stationary coal barge. On 5 November 1915, Lieutenant Commander Henry C. Mustin made the first catapult launch from a ship underway.

Application timeline

Interwar and World War II

The US Navy experimented with other power sources and models, including catapults that utilized gunpowder and flywheel variations. On 14 December 1924, a Martin MO-1 observation plane flown by Lt. L. C. Hayden was launched from  using a catapult powered by gunpowder. Following this launch, this method was used aboard both cruisers and battleships.

By 1929, the German ocean liners SS Bremen and Europa had been fitted with compressed-air catapults designed by the Heinkel aviation firm of Rostock, with further work with catapult air mail across the South Atlantic Ocean, being undertaken during the first half of the 1930s, with Dornier Wal twin-engined flying boats.

Up to and during World War II, most catapults on aircraft carriers were hydraulic. United States Navy catapults on surface warships, however, were operated with explosive charges similar to those used for  guns. Some carriers were completed before and during World War II with catapults on the hangar deck that fired athwartships, but they were unpopular because of their short run, low clearance of the hangar decks, inability to add the ship's forward speed to the aircraft's airspeed for takeoff, and lower clearance from the water (conditions which afforded pilots far less margin for error in the first moments of flight). They were mostly used for experimental purposes, and their use was entirely discontinued during the latter half of the war.

Many naval vessels apart from aircraft carriers carried float planes, seaplanes or amphibians for reconnaissance and spotting. They were catapult-launched and landed on the sea alongside for recovery by crane. Additionally, the concept of submarine aircraft carriers was developed by multiple nations during the interwar period, and through until WW2 and beyond, wherein a submarine would launch a small number of floatplanes for offensive operations or artillery spotting, to be recovered by the submarine once the aircraft has landed. Subsequently, many Royal Navy ships carried a catapult and from one to four aircraft; battleships or battlecruisers like  carried four aircraft and  carried two, while smaller warships like the cruiser  carried one. The aircraft carried were the Fairey Seafox or Supermarine Walrus. Some like  did not use a catapult, and the aircraft was lowered onto the sea for takeoff. Some had their aircraft and catapult removed during World War II e.g. , or before.

During World War II a number of ships were fitted with rocket-driven catapults, first the fighter catapult ships of the Royal Navy, then armed merchantmen known as CAM ships from "catapult armed merchantmen." These were used for convoy escort duties to drive off enemy reconnaissance bombers. CAM ships carried a Hawker Sea Hurricane 1A, dubbed a "Hurricat" or "Catafighter", and the pilot bailed out unless he could fly to land.

While imprisoned in Colditz Castle during the war, British prisoners of war planned an escape attempt using a falling bathtub full of heavy rocks and stones as the motive power for a catapult to be used for launching the Colditz Cock glider from the roof of the castle.

Ground-launched V-1s were typically propelled up an inclined launch ramp by an apparatus known as a Dampferzeuger ("steam generator").

Steam catapult

Following World War II, the Royal Navy was developing a new catapult system for their fleet of carriers. Commander Colin C. Mitchell, RNV, recommended a steam-based system as an effective and efficient means to launch the next generation of naval aircraft. Navies introduced steam catapults, capable of launching the heavier jet fighters, in the mid-1950s. Powder-driven catapults were also contemplated, and would have been powerful enough, but would also have introduced far greater stresses on the airframes and might have been unsuitable for long use.

At launch, a release bar holds the aircraft in place as steam pressure builds up, then breaks (or "releases"; older models used a pin that sheared), freeing the piston to pull the aircraft along the deck at high speed. Within about two to four seconds, aircraft velocity by the action of the catapult plus apparent wind speed (ship's speed plus or minus "natural" wind) is sufficient to allow an aircraft to fly away, even after losing one engine.

Nations that have retained large aircraft carriers, i.e., the United States Navy and the French Navy, are still using a CATOBAR (Catapult Assisted Take Off But Arrested Recovery) configuration. U.S. Navy tactical aircraft use catapults to launch with a heavier warload than would otherwise be possible.  Larger planes, such as the E-2 Hawkeye and S-3 Viking, require a catapult shot, since their thrust-to-weight ratio is too low for a conventional rolling takeoff on a carrier deck.

Steam catapults types
Presently or at one time operated by the U.S. and French navies include:

Bridle catchers

The protruding angled ramps (Van Velm Bridle Arresters or horns) at the catapult ends on some aircraft carriers were used to catch the bridles (connectors between the catapult shuttle and aircraft fuselage) for reuse. There were small ropes that would attach the bridle to the shuttle, which continued down the angled horn to pull the bridle down and away from the aircraft to keep it from damaging the underbelly. The bridle would then be caught by nets aside the horn. Bridles have not been used on U.S. aircraft since the end of the Cold War, and all U.S. Navy carriers commissioned since then have not had the ramps. The last U.S. carrier commissioned with a bridle catcher was USS Carl Vinson; starting with USS Theodore Roosevelt the ramps were deleted. During Refueling and Complex Overhaul refits in the late 1990s–early 2000s, the bridle catchers were removed from the first three s. USS Enterprise was the last U.S. Navy operational carrier with the ramps still attached before her inactivation in 2012.

Like her American counterparts today, the French aircraft carrier Charles De Gaulle is not equipped with bridle catchers because the modern aircraft operated on board use the same launch systems as in US Navy. Because of this mutual interoperability, American aircraft are also capable of being catapulted from and landing on Charles De Gaulle, and conversely, French naval aircraft can use the US Navy carriers' catapults. At the time when the Super Étendard was operated on board of the Charles de Gaulle, its bridles were used only once, as they were never recovered by bridle catchers.

Electromagnetic catapult 

The size and manpower requirements of steam catapults place limits on their capabilities. A newer approach is the  electromagnetic catapult, such as Electromagnetic Aircraft Launch System (EMALS) developed by General Atomics. Electromagnetic catapults place less stress on the aircraft and offer more control during the launch by allowing gradual and continual acceleration.  Electromagnetic catapults are also expected to require significantly less maintenance through the use of solid state components.

Linear induction motors have been experimented with before, such as Westinghouse's Electropult system in 1945. However, at the beginning of the 21st century, navies again started experimenting with catapults powered by linear induction motors and electromagnets. Electromagnetic catapult would be more energy efficient on nuclear-powered aircraft carriers and would alleviate some of the dangers posed by using pressurized steam. On gas-turbine powered ships, an electromagnetic catapult would eliminate the need for a separate steam boiler for generating catapult steam. The U.S. Navy's s and PLA Navy’s Type 003 aircraft carrier included electromagnetic catapults in their design.

Civilian use
These ships served the route between Germany and the United States. The aircraft, carrying mail–bags, would be launched as a mail tender while the ship was still many hundreds of miles from its destination, thus speeding mail delivery by about a day. Initially, Heinkel He 12 aircraft were used before they were replaced by Junkers Ju 46, which were in turn replaced by the Vought V-85G.

On route proving flights in 1933, and a scheduled service beginning in February 1934, Wals flew the trans-ocean stage of the route, between Bathurst, the Gambia in West Africa and Fernando de Noronha, an island group off South America. At first, there was a refueling stop in mid-ocean. The flying boat would land on the open sea, be winched aboard by a crane, refueled, and then launched by catapult back into the air. However, landing on the big ocean swells tended to damage the hull of the flying boats. From September 1934, Lufthansa had a support ship at each end of the trans-ocean stage, providing radio navigation signals and catapult launchings after carrying aircraft out to sea overnight. From April 1935 the Wals were launched directly offshore, and flew the entire distance across the ocean. This was possible as the flying boats could carry more fuel when they did not have to take off from the water under their own power, and cut the time it took for mail to get from Germany to Brazil from four days down to three.

From 1936 to 1938, tests including the Blohm & Voss Ha 139 flying boat were conducted on the North Atlantic route to New York. Schwabenland was also used in an Antarctic expedition in 1938/39 with the main purpose of finding an area for a German whaling station, in which catapult-launched Wals surveyed a territory subsequently claimed by Germany as New Swabia. All of Lufthansa catapult ships were taken over by the Luftwaffe in 1939 and used as seaplane tenders in World War II along with three catapult ships built for the military.

After World War II, Supermarine Walrus amphibian aircraft were also briefly operated by a British whaling company, United Whalers. Operating in the Antarctic, they were launched from the factory ship FF Balaena, which had been equipped with an ex-navy aircraft catapult.

Alternatives to catapults

The Chinese, Indian, and Russian navies operate conventional aircraft from STOBAR aircraft carriers (Short Take-Off But Arrested Landing). Instead of a catapult, they use a ski jump to assist aircraft in taking off with a positive rate of climb. Carrier aircraft such as the J-15, Mig-29K, and Su-33 rely on their own engines to accelerate to flight speed. As a result, they must take off with a reduced load of fuel and armaments.

All other navies with aircraft carriers operate STOVL aircraft, such as the F-35B Lightning II, the Sea Harrier, and the AV-8B Harrier II. These aircraft can take off vertically with a light load, or use a ski jump to assist a rolling takeoff with a heavy load. STOVL carriers are less expensive and generally smaller in size compared to CATOBAR carriers.

See also
 Ground carriage
 Jet blast deflector
 Modern US Navy carrier operations
 Naval aviation

References

Bibliography

 London, Peter. British Flying Boats. Stoud, UK: Sutton Publishers Ltd., 2003. .
 .

Catapult
 Catapult